English lions may refer to the following:

 The lions in the Royal Arms of England
 The lion which appears as a supporter on the Royal Arms of England and of its successor states
 One of the national symbols of England, the Barbary lion
 British big cats, alleged big feline creatures living on the British Isles

See also
 Lion of England (disambiguation)
 British Lions (disambiguation)
 England Lions (disambiguation)
 The Lion and the Unicorn
 Barbary lion
 European lion